Field pansy is a common name for several plants and may refer to:

Viola arvensis, also called the European field pansy
Viola bicolor, also called the American field pansy